is a passenger railway station located in Minami-ku of the city of Okayama, Okayama Prefecture, Japan. It is operated by the West Japan Railway Company (JR West).

Lines

Station layout
The station consists of a single side platform on a slight embankment, serving a single bi-directional line. There is no station building, but only a small shelter directly on the platform and the station is unattended.

History
Bitchū-Mishima Station was opened on 1 January 1939. It was closed from1 November 1940 to 14 November 1950. With the privatization of Japanese National Railways (JNR) on 1 April 1987, the station came under the control of JR West.

Passenger statistics
In fiscal 2019, the station was used by an average of 201 passengers daily

Surrounding area
Okayama City Minami Ward Office Senoo Regional Center
Okayama Municipal Seno Hospital
Okayama Municipal Minoshima Elementary School

See also
List of railway stations in Japan

References

External links

 JR West Station Official Site

Railway stations in Okayama
Uno Line
Railway stations in Japan opened in 1939